RAAT or Raat may refer to:

 Raat (film), 1992 Indian horror film
 a section of Stadel bei Niederglatt municipality, Zürich, Switzerland

See also
 Rat (disambiguation)
 Ratt (disambiguation)
 RRAT